Alderney (Aurigny) is an island in the Channel Islands.

Alderney may also refer to:

 Alderney, Dorset
 States of Alderney, parliament and council of the island
 Air Alderney, airline serving the island
 Alderney cattle, an extinct breed of dairy cattle
 HMS Alderney, multiple ships
 Alderney, a fictional state, based on New Jersey, appearing in the video game Grand Theft Auto IV
Alderney, a fictional Wombles character in children's novels and TV series

See also